Mika Ääritalo (born 25 July 1985) is a Finnish retired international footballer who played as a striker.

Career

Club career
After beginning his senior career in 2002 with hometown club TPS Turku, English Premiership side Aston Villa beat a host of clubs from across Europe to the signing of Ääritalo in January 2003. After failing to make a first-team appearance for Aston Villa, Ääritalo returned to his first club, TPS Turku, in February 2005.

In June 2008, Portuguese BWINLIGA club C.D. Nacional were interested in signing Ääritalo, but the deal fell through due to cost and the fact that Ääritalo did not want to move to Portugal.

In January 2014, he joined the German 3. Liga side Holstein Kiel on a six-month loan. He has since played for Turun Palloseura, FC Lahti and Kuopion Palloseura.

International career
Ääritalo made his international debut in 2010. He scored his first international goal on 22 January 2012, in a friendly against Trinidad and Tobago.

Career statistics

International goals

International

References

External links
 
 

1985 births
Living people
Finnish footballers
Finnish expatriate footballers
Finland international footballers
Aston Villa F.C. players
Turun Palloseura footballers
FC Lahti players
Kuopion Palloseura players
Veikkausliiga players
3. Liga players
Holstein Kiel players
Expatriate footballers in Germany
Expatriate footballers in England
Finnish expatriate sportspeople in England
Finnish expatriate sportspeople in Germany
Association football forwards
People from Taivassalo
Sportspeople from Southwest Finland